The Order of St. Vladimir, Third Class (Vladimir tret'jej stepeni) is an unfinished play by Nikolai Gogol, which he worked on between 1832 and 1834.

Structure 
The work survives only in four fragments: "An Official's Morning" (Утро делового человека), "The Lawsuit" (Тяжба), "The Servants' Quarters" (Лакейская) and "Fragment" (Отрывок). Each fragment follows the official Barsukov, in search of his dream to receive a decoration, the Order of Vladimir.

Surviving scenes 
The scene or subplot "The Lawsuit", concerns the lawsuit brought against Barsukov by his brother regarding the inheritance from their aunt. The scene is the base of the opera The Lawsuit.

According to Gogol's contemporaries, a lost scene showed Barsukov in front of a mirror in which he sees the decoration, finally believing he is the decoration.

References

Works by Nikolai Gogol
Unfinished plays